Mark Amos (born 5 August 1951) is a former Australian rules footballer who played for  and Fitzroy in the Victorian Football League (VFL).

Career

Amos was recruited to Carlton from Diamond Valley Football League (DVFL) club Montmorency in 1970. He played six games for the Blues in 1970 and 1971.

He was cleared to Fitzroy in 1972, where he played one game, against Carlton, kicking a goal.

References

1951 births
Living people
Australian rules footballers from Victoria (Australia)
Carlton Football Club players
Montmorency Football Club players
Fitzroy Football Club players
Place of birth missing (living people)